Bernardsville is a borough in Somerset County, in the U.S. state of New Jersey. The borough is nestled in the heart of the Raritan Valley region. As of the 2020 United States census, the borough's population was 7,893, an increase of 186 (+2.4%) from the 2010 census count of 7,707, which in turn reflected an increase of 362 (+4.9%) from the 7,345 counted in the 2000 census. Bernardsville is often mispronounced as "Ber-NARDS-ville" as opposed to the correct pronunciation "BER-nards-ville".

Bernardsville was incorporated as a borough by an act of the New Jersey Legislature on March 6, 1924, from portions of Bernards Township, based on the results of a referendum held on April 29, 1924. The borough was named for Sir Francis Bernard, 1st Baronet, who served as governor of the Province of New Jersey before the Revolutionary War. In 2009, part of the borough was listed on the National Register of Historic Places as the Olcott Avenue Historic District.

In 2000, Bernardsville had the 10th-highest per capita income in the state. Based on data from the 2006–2010 American Community Survey, the borough had a per-capita income of $70,141, ranked 27th in the state. In 2019, the borough was ranked by Bloomberg News as 64th on its 2019 list of Bloomberg Richest Places, one of 18 in the state included on the list.

History
Bernardsville was originally a section of Bernards Township known as Vealtown. In 1840, Vealtown became Bernardsville, named after Sir Francis Bernard, Colonial governor of New Jersey from 1758 to 1760.

During the Revolutionary War, General Charles Lee rested his troops in Vealtown around the night of December 12 to 13, 1776. On the morning of December 13, General Lee was captured by the British and removed to New York. The Vealtown Tavern, now known as the John Parker Tavern, was a regular stop during the 1779–1780 winter encampment at Morristown.

After the Civil War, many wealthy and prominent New Yorkers moved into the area, first as summer visitors, then later as permanent residents of the Bernardsville Mountain.  For most, the men worked in New York City while the women and children spent summers in Bernardsville.  The Gladstone Branch of the existing railroad line was built through Bernardsville in 1872 and played an important role in the borough's development. The Gladstone line, whose five o'clock train was appropriately nicknamed "the millionaire's special," as it was direct route to Penn Station, allowed the men who built grand estates in Bernardsville to commute to the city on a daily basis rather than only visit their families on weekends. Bernardsville did not become an independent municipality until 1924, when it split from Bernards Township.

On November 4, 2020, The Bernardsville Library announced that it would join the MAIN Library System, which has member libraries in all of Morris County, all of Hunterdon County and parts of Somerset and Warren counties. The Bernardsville Library is the second library from Somerset County to join the MAIN System, after the Bernards Township Library in neighboring Bernards Township. The library joined the MAIN System on January 11, 2021

On January 15, 2021, Kings Food Markets announced that it would close their Bernardsville location on Morristown Road, officially closing on January 23, 2021.

Historic district
The New Jersey State Review Board for Historic Sites recommended the creation of the Olcott Avenue historic district on February 10, 2009. While the Olcott Avenue School is but one historic structure within Bernardsville's first historic district area, the area's appeal and historic significance is part of the story of the rise of the middle class in Bernardsville and how this particular location impacted the entire region, from the downtown, Little Italy, and the Mountain Colony areas.

The Olcott Avenue Historic District is a  historic district located along portions of Olcott, Childsworth, and Highview Avenues, and Church Street that recognizes a neighborhood developed in the early 20th century. It was added to the National Register of Historic Places on November 20, 2009, for its significance in architecture, community planning and development, and education.

According to the National Park Service:
The Olcott Avenue neighborhood in the borough of Bernardsville, located in northeast Somerset County, was developed at the turn of the 20th century as a carefully laid out middle class residential neighborhood. The streets in the district are characterized by lots of moderate size with regular setbacks with moderate to substantial dwellings constructed in a variety of late 19th and early 20th century architectural styles, several of which are particularly noteworthy examples. The original dwellings constructed during the first three decades or so of the 20th century all still stand and the streetscape has changed relatively little since curbs and sidewalks were added and the road was paved around 1916. Residents of the district have continued the long tradition of participation in civic activities.

Olcott Avenue is named after Frederic P. Olcott, a New York banker, politician, and philanthropist, who lived here. The street was originally named after Stewart Wolfe. In 1905, Olcott financed the construction of a high school, the first in the township, and donated it to the Bernards Township Board of Education. The stone building features Tudor Revival style and was designed by architect Henry Janeway Hardenbergh, who also lived here. Hardenbergh also designed the Bernardsville United Methodist Church and the parish house at St. Bernard's Church. The district includes several houses designed with Colonial Revival style.

Geography
According to the United States Census Bureau, the borough had a total area of 12.91 square miles (33.44 km2), including 12.84 square miles (33.24 km2) of land and 0.08 square miles (0.19 km2) of water (0.58%).

Unincorporated communities, localities and place names located partially or completely within the borough include Blazuers Corner, Mine Brook and Somerseten.

The borough borders Bernards Township to the east, Far Hills to the southwest, and Peapack-Gladstone to the west in Somerset County, Harding Township to the northeast and both Mendham Borough and Mendham Township to the northwest in Morris County.

Climate
Bernardsville has a climate that borders between Humid continental and Humid subtropical with cool sometimes cold winters and warm to hot, humid summers on average. High elevations of the town have a warm summer humid continental climate with more snow during the winter and more orographic precipitation. Summer is the wettest season with frequent afternoon thunderstorms while Winter is the driest season.

Demographics

Some of Bernardsville's Latino population are made up of residents of "Little Paraguay" located on the Basking Ridge side of the train tracks.

2010 census

The Census Bureau's 2006–2010 American Community Survey showed that (in 2010 inflation-adjusted dollars) median household income was $128,333 (with a margin of error of +/− $12,233) and the median family income was $141,510 (+/− $17,179). Males had a median income of $87,500 (+/− $36,816) versus $73,250 (+/− $10,725) for females. The per capita income for the borough was $70,141 (+/− $9,890). About 1.9% of families and 2.3% of the population were below the poverty line, including 1.2% of those under age 18 and 5.2% of those age 65 or over.

2000 census
As of the 2000 United States census there were 7,345 people, 2,723 households, and 2,050 families residing in the borough. The population density was 568.1 people per square mile (219.3/km2). There were 2,807 housing units at an average density of 217.1 per square mile (83.8/km2). The racial makeup of the borough was 93.94% White, 0.25% African American, 0.15% Native American, 2.64% Asian, 1.55% from other races, and 1.47% from two or more races. Hispanic or Latino of any race were 5.98% of the population. 

There were 2,723 households, out of which 35.9% had children under the age of 18 living with them, 67.2% were married couples living together, 6.0% had a female householder with no husband present, and 24.7% were non-families. 21.0% of all households were made up of individuals, and 8.4% had someone living alone who was 65 years of age or older. The average household size was 2.69 and the average family size was 3.12.

In the borough the population was spread out, with 26.1% under the age of 18, 4.5% from 18 to 24, 28.7% from 25 to 44, 28.0% from 45 to 64, and 12.7% who were 65 years of age or older. The median age was 40 years. For every 100 females, there were 96.1 males. For every 100 females age 18 and over, there were 92.3 males.

The median income for a household in the borough was $104,162, and the median income for a family was $126,601. Males had a median income of $91,842 versus $50,732 for females. The per capita income for the borough was $69,854. About 1.6% of families and 2.8% of the population were below the poverty line, including 2.3% of those under age 18 and 2.5% of those age 65 or over.

Government

Local government

Bernardsville is governed under the Borough form of New Jersey municipal government, which is used in 218 municipalities (of the 564) statewide, making it the most common form of government in New Jersey. The governing body is comprised of the Mayor and the Borough Council, with all positions elected at-large on a partisan basis as part of the November general election. A Mayor is elected directly by the voters to a four-year term of office. The Borough Council is comprised of six members elected to serve three-year terms on a staggered basis, with two seats coming up for election each year in a three-year cycle. The Borough form of government used by Bernardsville is a "weak mayor / strong council" government in which council members act as the legislative body with the mayor presiding at meetings and voting only in the event of a tie. The mayor can veto ordinances subject to an override by a two-thirds majority vote of the council. The mayor makes committee and liaison assignments for council members, and most appointments are made by the mayor with the advice and consent of the council.

, the Mayor of Bernardsville is Republican Mary Jane Canose, whose term of office ends December 31, 2022. Members of the Borough Council are Council President Chad McQueen (R, 2022), Jay Ambelang (R, 2024), Diane Greenfield (R, 2023; elected to serve an unexpired term), Jena McCredie (R, 2022), Albert Ribeiro (R, 2024) and Christine Zamarra (D, 2023).

In June 2021, Democrat Thomas O'Dea Jr. resigned from office from a seat expiring on December 2023. In July 2021, the Borough Council selected Matthew Marino from a list of three candidates nominated by the Democratic municipal committee to fill the vacant seat on an interim basis. In November 2021, Republican Diane Greenfield was elected to serve the balance of the term of office.

In December 2018, the Borough Council selected Diane Greenfield from a list of three candidates nominated by the Republican municipal committee to fill the balance of the unexpired term of office ending in December 2019 that had been held by Michael C. Sullivan until he resigned from office earlier that month.

In February 2018, Republican John Donahue was selected by the Borough Council from three candidates nominated by the local party committee and appointed to fill the seat expiring in December 2018 that had been held by Michael dePoortere until he resigned from office earlier that month; Donohue will serve on an interim basis until the November 2018 general election.

In March 2018, Mayor Kevin Sooy, elected as a Republican, announced that he was switching parties and would run for re-election as a Democrat, saying that he was in sync with the platform of the local Democratic Party on issues facing the town.

In 2018, the borough had an average property tax bill of $15,362, the highest in the county, compared to an average bill of $8,767 statewide.

Federal, state and county representation
Bernardsville is located in the 7th Congressional District and is part of New Jersey's 25th state legislative district. Prior to the 2011 reapportionment following the 2010 Census, Bernardsville had been in the 16th state legislative district.

 

Somerset County is governed by a five-member Board of County Commissioners, whose members are elected at-large to three-year terms of office on a staggered basis, with one or two seats coming up for election each year. At an annual reorganization meeting held on the first Friday of January, the board selects a Director and Deputy Director from among its members. , Somerset County's County Commissioners are
Director Shanel Robinson (D, Franklin Township, term as commissioner ends December 31, 2024; term as director ends 2022),
Deputy Director Melonie Marano (D, Green Brook Township, term as commissioner and as deputy director ends 2022),
Paul Drake (D, Hillsborough Township, 2023),
Douglas Singleterry (D, North Plainfield, 2023) and 
Sara Sooy (D, Basking Ridge in Bernards Township, 2024).
Pursuant to Article VII Section II of the New Jersey State Constitution, each county in New Jersey is required to have three elected administrative officials known as constitutional officers. These officers are the County Clerk and County Surrogate (both elected for five-year terms of office) and the County Sheriff (elected for a three-year term). Constitutional officers, elected on a countywide basis are 
County Clerk Steve Peter (D, Somerville, 2022),
Sheriff Darrin Russo (D, Franklin Township, 2022) and 
Surrogate Bernice "Tina" Jalloh (D, Franklin Township, 2025)

Politics

As of March 2011, there were a total of 5,341 registered voters in Bernardsville, of which 955 (17.9% vs. 26.0% countywide) were registered as Democrats, 2,472 (46.3% vs. 25.7%) were registered as Republicans and 1,913 (35.8% vs. 48.2%) were registered as unaffiliated. There was one voter registered to another party. Among the borough's 2010 Census population, 69.3% (vs. 60.4% in Somerset County) were registered to vote, including 97.1% of those ages 18 and over (vs. 80.4% countywide).

In the 2012 presidential election, Republican Mitt Romney received 61.5% of the vote (2,318 cast), ahead of incumbent President Barack Obama, a Democrat, with 37.3% (1,408 votes), and other candidates with 1.2% (44 votes), among the 3,788 ballots cast by the borough's 5,673 registered voters (18 ballots were spoiled), for a turnout of 66.8%. In the 2008 presidential election, Republican John McCain received 2,295 votes (55.8% vs. 46.1% countywide), ahead of Democrat Obama with 1,753 votes (42.6% vs. 52.1%) and other candidates with 41 votes (1.0% vs. 1.1%), among the 4,113 ballots cast by the borough's 5,208 registered voters, for a turnout of 79.0% (vs. 78.7% in Somerset County). In the 2004 presidential election, Republican George W. Bush received 2,495 votes (61.0% vs. 51.5% countywide), ahead of Democrat John Kerry with 1,543 votes (37.7% vs. 47.2%) and other candidates with 37 votes (0.9% vs. 0.9%), among the 4,093 ballots cast by the borough's 4,909 registered voters, for a turnout of 83.4% (vs. 81.7% in the whole county).

In the 2013 gubernatorial election, Republican Chris Christie received 77.9% of the vote (2,118 cast), ahead of Democrat Barbara Buono with 20.7% (564 votes), and other candidates with 1.4% (37 votes), among the 2,762 ballots cast by the borough's 5,728 registered voters (43 ballots were spoiled), for a turnout of 48.2%. In the 2009 gubernatorial election, Republican Christie received 1,867 votes (60.2% vs. 55.8% countywide), ahead of Democrat Jon Corzine with 747 votes (24.1% vs. 34.1%), Independent Chris Daggett with 463 votes (14.9% vs. 8.7%) and other candidates with 13 votes (0.4% vs. 0.7%), among the 3,099 ballots cast by the borough's 5,304 registered voters, yielding a 58.4% turnout (vs. 52.5% in the county).

Education
Public school students in pre-kindergarten through twelfth grade attend the schools of the Somerset Hills Regional School District, a regional school district serving students from Bernardsville, Far Hills and Peapack-Gladstone, along with students from Bedminster who are sent to the district's high school as part of a sending/receiving relationship. As of the 2020–21 school year, the district, comprised of three schools, had an enrollment of 1,797 students and 155.3 classroom teachers (on an FTE basis), for a student–teacher ratio of 11.6:1. Schools in the district (with 2020–21 enrollment data from the National Center for Education Statistics) are 
Marion T. Bedwell Elementary School with 471 students in grades Pre-K–4, 
Bernardsville Middle School with 474 students in grades 5–8 and 
Bernards High School with 819 students in grades 9–12. The district's board of education is comprised of nine elected members (plus one appointed member representing Bedminster) who set policy and oversee the fiscal and educational operation of the district through its administration. The nine elected seats on the board are allocated to the constituent municipalities based on population, with six seats allocated to Bernardsville.

The School of Saint Elizabeth, established in 1916, is a parochial school serving students in pre-kindergarten through eighth grade that operates under the auspices of the Roman Catholic Diocese of Metuchen.

Transportation

Roads and highways

The most prominent roads directly serving Bernardsville are U.S. Route 202 and County Route 525. Interstate 287 passes by just outside the borough.

Public transportation
NJ Transit train service is offered at the Bernardsville station on the Gladstone Branch and Morristown Line of the Morris & Essex Lines, with service to Hoboken Terminal, Newark Broad Street station Secaucus Junction and to Penn Station in Midtown Manhattan.

Lakeland Bus Lines provides Route 78 rush-hour service from Bedminster to the Port Authority Bus Terminal in Midtown Manhattan.

Notable people

People who were born in, residents of, or otherwise closely associated with Bernardsville include:

 Walt Ader (1913–1982), race car driver who placed 22nd at the 1950 Indianapolis 500
 Brooke Astor (1902–2007), lived here during her marriage to John Dryden Kuser (1897–1964)
 Roger Bart (born 1962), actor
 Sir Francis Bernard (1712–1779), British colonial administrator who served as governor of the provinces of New Jersey and Massachusetts Bay
 C. Ledyard Blair (1867–1949), prominent resident and investment banker
 Roger Bodman (born 1952), politician and political strategist who served in the cabinet of New Jersey Governor Thomas Kean
 Philip Capice (1931–2009), Emmy-award-winning television producer
 Tommy Dorsey (1905–1956), jazz musician who lived at "Tall Oaks" in Bernardsville from 1935 to 1941 
 Forrest F. Dryden (1864–1932), President of Prudential Insurance Company
 John Fairfield Dryden (1839–1911), founder of Prudential Insurance Company and U.S. Senator
 Ernest Duncan (1916–1990), mathematician
 Marc Ecko (born 1972), fashion designer and entrepreneur
 Millicent Fenwick (1910–1992), U.S. Congresswoman, United States representative to the United Nations Food and Agriculture Organization
 Zach Feuer (born 1978), art dealer, founder of New Art Dealers Alliance and owner of Zach Feuer Gallery
 Guy Gabrielson (1891–1976), politician who served as chairman of the Republican National Committee from 1949 to 1952, and was a member of the New Jersey General Assembly from 1925 to 1929
 Alina Habba (born 1984), lawyer best known for representing former President of the United States, Donald Trump.
 Henry Janeway Hardenbergh (1847–1918), architect
 Jacqueline Kennedy Onassis (1929–1994), former first lady, who lived in Bernardsville with her husband Aristotle Onassis (1906–1975)
 Elmer Matthews (1927–2015), lawyer and politician who served three terms in the New Jersey General Assembly
 Andrew McCarthy (born 1962), actor
 Katie Meyler (born 1982), 2014's Time Person of the Year for Ebola Fighters
 Bill Moyers (born 1934), journalist and commentator
 Bob Nash (1892–1977), pioneering football player in the earliest days of the National Football League
 Frederic P. Olcott (1841–1909), financier, politician, and philanthropist
 George B. Post (1837–1913), Beaux-Arts style architect, and early developer of Bernardsville
 Donald Roebling (1908–1959), inventor of the amphtrack
 John A. Roebling II (1867–1952), engineer and philanthropist
 Carol Stiff, women's basketball executive, who is vice president of programming and acquisitions at ESPN and president of the Women's Basketball Hall of Fame's board of directors
 Suzanne Scott (born 1965/66), CEO of Fox News
 Meryl Streep (born 1949), actress
 Mike Tyson (born 1966) and Robin Givens (born 1964)
 Jean Villepique, actress known for her roles in BoJack Horseman, A.P. Bio and Up All Night

References

External links

 Bernardsville official web site
 Bernardsville's Name and The Royal Governor Sir Francis Bernard, Esq.
 Retrospective: Jackie Kennedy Onassis’ Time in Bernardsville-Peapack
 Bernardsville History – Mr. Local History Project
 Why was Bernardsville called Vealtown – Mr. Local History Project

 
1924 establishments in New Jersey
Borough form of New Jersey government
Boroughs in Somerset County, New Jersey
Populated places established in 1924